are Japanese Buddhist icons or statues concealed from public view. Hibutsu are generally located within Buddhist temples in shrines called . They are generally unavailable for viewing or worship, although they are brought out for specific religious ceremonies; it is also possible in some cases for the hibutsu to be viewed in exchange for an offering to the temple. Certain hibutsu, such as the wooden statue of Gautama Buddha at Seiryō-ji or the Amida statuary at Zenkō-ji, are almost never displayed, even to initiates of the temples in which they are held (such examples are known as zettai hibutsu). Others are put on public display only rarely, in a ceremony called .

History
Whilst the practice of concealing important religious artefacts within zushi or behind curtains dates to the Heian period, the concept of hibutsu is slightly later. The earliest record of an actual hibutsu dates from 1106, when sources indicate the Amida statues at Zenkō-ji were briefly put on display. By the Edo period hibutsu had become a popular concept in Japanese Buddhism, and during this time kaichō ceremonies became major public events, drawing crowds of thousands. It has been noted by art historians such as Shiro Ito that hibutsu are a uniquely Japanese phenomenon; other Buddhist cultures do not have any equivalent practice.

The concealment of the hibutsu is intended to emphasise their potency and transcendence. It may also serve to protect them from pollution by the impure influences of the mundane world, or to preserve the personal privacy of these "living" embodiments of Buddhism.

Liza Dalby's novel Hidden Buddhas is based on the concept of hibutsu.

References

Buddhism in Japan
Buddhist art
Buddha statues